Wharton is a borough in Morris County, in the U.S. state of New Jersey. As of the 2020 United States census, the borough's population was 7,241, an increase of 719 (+11.0%) from the 2010 census count of 6,522, which in turn reflected an increase of 224 (+3.6%) from the 6,298 counted in the 2000 census.

Wharton was originally incorporated as the borough Port Oram by an act of the New Jersey Legislature on June 26, 1895, created from portions of Randolph Township and Rockaway Township, subject to the results of a referendum passed on the previous day; the name was changed to Wharton on April 16, 1902, based on a referendum held that day and subject to legislation passed on March 27, 1902. The borough was named for Joseph Wharton of the Wharton Steel Company.

History
In 1831, the Morris Canal was completed from Newark to Phillipsburg, New Jersey across the Delaware River from the terminus of the Lehigh Canal. On the way, it passed through Boonton, Dover and Port Oram. On this route it tapped the Morris County ore fields and became a carrier for both ore and pig iron. Its main purpose, however, was as an extension of the Lehigh Canal to furnish a route for anthracite coal from the Pennsylvania mines to seaboard. Any local traffic was a gain to supplement the through anthracite freight and iron ore and its products soon became important sources of revenue. Sites on the canal were selected for docks and industry, including iron works.

A mayor, six councilmen, an assessor and a collector were elected to govern the new borough which had started life as an ore shipping port on the Morris Canal. These elected officials (mine superintendents, store owners, a railroad superintendent and a school teacher) represented the leaders of these settlements where iron ore was mined, smelted and shipped.

The borough was renamed in 1902 in honor of Joseph Wharton, who was born in 1826 in Philadelphia to an old family of Quakers. Wharton first studied at a local Quaker school after which he worked on a farm rather than attend college because his parents wanted him to mature, and during the winter studied chemistry at the laboratory of Martin Hans Boyè in Philadelphia. He started producing zinc and nickel, and gradually bought a controlling interest in Bethlehem Iron Works. As his business interests expanded he purchased substantial shares of several railroads involved in the coal and iron trade, also purchasing iron mines and furnaces near Port Oram. After selling his interest in Bethlehem Iron Works in 1901 and his nickel works to CVRD Inco in 1902, he continued to actively acquire and manage a large and diverse business empire that included iron smelting in Wharton until just before his death in January, 1909.  Wharton also endowed the Wharton School of the University of Pennsylvania.  The town was named after him at after a referendum in 1902.

In 1984, the long-time local bar The Heslin House and Hartley's Store were destroyed in a gas leak explosion, in which flames as high as  destroyed several area buildings.

Wharton was used as a filming location for Cyndi Lauper's music video "Time After Time" in 1984.

Geography
According to the United States Census Bureau, the borough had a total area of 2.13 square miles (5.51 km2), including 2.07 square miles (5.37 km2) of land and 0.06 square miles (0.14 km2) of water (2.63%).

The borough borders the Morris County municipalities of Dover, Jefferson Township, Mine Hill Township, Rockaway Township, Roxbury Township.

Unincorporated communities in the borough include Irondale, Luxemburg, Maryville, Mount Pleasant and Port Oram.

Climate
The climate in this area is characterized by hot, humid summers and generally mild to cool winters.  According to the Köppen Climate Classification system, Wharton has a humid subtropical climate, abbreviated "Cfa" on climate maps.

Demographics

2010 census

The Census Bureau's 2006–2010 American Community Survey showed that (in 2010 inflation-adjusted dollars) median household income was $73,571 (with a margin of error of +/− $8,504) and the median family income was $75,176 (+/− $9,601). Males had a median income of $48,750 (+/− $12,951) versus $31,105 (+/− $5,994) for females. The per capita income for the borough was $27,233 (+/− $2,723). About 6.6% of families and 6.8% of the population were below the poverty line, including 8.6% of those under age 18 and none of those age 65 or over.

2000 census
As of the 2000 United States census there were 6,298 people, 2,328 households, and 1,599 families residing in the borough. The population density was 2,882.4 people per square mile (1,110.4/km2). There were 2,394 housing units at an average density of 1,095.6 per square mile (422.1/km2). The racial makeup of the borough was 82.09% White, 4.40% African American, 0.44% Native American, 3.14% Asian, 7.21% from other races, and 2.72% from two or more races. Hispanic or Latino of any race were 23.21% of the population.

There were 2,328 households, out of which 34.6% had children under the age of 18 living with them, 52.1% were married couples living together, 12.0% had a female householder with no husband present and 31.3% were non-families. 26.5% of all households were made up of individuals, and 10.4% had someone living alone who was 65 years of age or older. The average household size was 2.70 and the average family size was 3.28.

In the borough the population age was spread out, with 26.0% under the age of 18, 6.8% from 18 to 24, 34.0% from 25 to 44, 21.9% from 45 to 64, and 11.3% who were 65 years of age or older. The median age was 36 years. For every 100 females, there were 93.5 males. For every 100 females age 18 and over, there were 88.8 males.

The median income for a household in the borough was $56,580, and the median income for a family was $64,957. Males had a median income of $42,311 versus $36,016 for females. The per capita income for the borough was $25,168. About 6.4% of families and 8.3% of the population were below the poverty line, including 15.0% of those under age 18 and 4.2% of those age 65 or over.

Parks and recreation

The Hugh Force Canal Park provides hiking trails along the former Morris Canal and abandoned railroad beds. It features Lock 2 East of the canal.

Government

Local government
Wharton is governed under the Borough form of New Jersey municipal government, which is used in 218 municipalities (of the 564) statewide, making it the most common form of government in New Jersey. The governing body is comprised of the Mayor and the Borough Council, with all positions elected at-large on a partisan basis as part of the November general election. The Mayor is elected directly by the voters to a four-year term of office. The Borough Council is comprised of six members elected to serve three-year terms on a staggered basis, with two seats coming up for election each year in a three-year cycle. The Borough form of government used by Wharton is a "weak mayor / strong council" government in which council members act as the legislative body with the mayor presiding at meetings and voting only in the event of a tie. The mayor can veto ordinances subject to an override by a two-thirds majority vote of the council. The mayor makes committee and liaison assignments for council members, and most appointments are made by the mayor with the advice and consent of the council.

, the Mayor of Wharton is Republican William J. Chegwidden, whose term of office ends December 31, 2022. Members of the Borough Council are Council President Vincent Binkoski (R, 2023), Sandra L. Hayes (R, 2023), Robert Norton (R, 2022), Paola Vasquez (R, 2022), Thomas C. Yeager (R, 2024) and Nicole Wickenheisser (R, 2024).

Dover serves as the lead agency operating a joint municipal court that includes Wharton and the neighboring municipalities of Mine Hill Township, Mount Arlington and Victory Gardens. Established in 2009, the joint municipal court was forecast to offer annual savings in excess of $250,000 over the 10-year life of the agreement.

Federal, state and county representation
Wharton is located in the 7th Congressional District and is part of New Jersey's 25th state legislative district.

 

Morris County is governed by a Board of County Commissioners comprised of seven members who are elected at-large in partisan elections to three-year terms on a staggered basis, with either one or three seats up for election each year as part of the November general election. Actual day-to-day operation of departments is supervised by County Administrator, John Bonanni. , Morris County's Commissioners are
Commissioner Director Tayfun Selen (R, Chatham Township, term as commissioner ends December 31, 2023; term as director ends 2022),
Commissioner Deputy Director John Krickus (R, Washington Township, term as commissioner ends 2024; term as deputy director ends 2022),
Douglas Cabana (R, Boonton Township, 2022), 
Kathryn A. DeFillippo (R, Roxbury, 2022),
Thomas J. Mastrangelo (R, Montville, 2022),
Stephen H. Shaw (R, Mountain Lakes, 2024) and
Deborah Smith (R, Denville, 2024).
The county's constitutional officers are the County Clerk and County Surrogate (both elected for five-year terms of office) and the County Sheriff (elected for a three-year term). , they are 
County Clerk Ann F. Grossi (R, Parsippany–Troy Hills, 2023),
Sheriff James M. Gannon (R, Boonton Township, 2022) and
Surrogate Heather Darling (R, Roxbury, 2024).

Politics
As of March 2011, Wharton had a total of 3,258 registered voters, of which 923 (28.3%) were registered as Democrats, 935 (28.7%) were registered as Republicans and 1,397 (42.9%) were registered as Unaffiliated. Three voters were registered as Libertarians or Greens.

In the 2012 presidential election, Democrat Barack Obama received 56.0% of the vote (1,310 cast), ahead of Republican Mitt Romney with 43.0% (1,006 votes), and other candidates with 1.0% (24 votes), among the 2,359 ballots cast by the borough's 3,455 registered voters (19 ballots were spoiled), for a turnout of 68.3%. In the 2008 presidential election, Democrat Barack Obama received 51.8% of the vote (1,326 cast), ahead of Republican John McCain with 47.0% (1,202 votes) and other candidates with 0.7% (19 votes), among the 2,559 ballots cast by the borough's 3,432 registered voters, for a turnout of 74.6%. In the 2004 presidential election, Republican George W. Bush received 54.4% of the vote (1,334 ballots cast), outpolling Democrat John Kerry with 44.6% (1,092 votes) and other candidates with 0.5% (16 votes), among the 2,451 ballots cast by the borough's 3,510 registered voters, for a turnout percentage of 69.8.

In the 2013 gubernatorial election, Republican Chris Christie received 65.9% of the vote (892 cast), ahead of Democrat Barbara Buono with 32.1% (434 votes), and other candidates with 2.0% (27 votes), among the 1,381 ballots cast by the borough's 3,449 registered voters (28 ballots were spoiled), for a turnout of 40.0%. In the 2009 gubernatorial election, Republican Chris Christie received 52.9% of the vote (848 ballots cast), ahead of Democrat Jon Corzine with 36.6% (586 votes), Independent Chris Daggett with 8.6% (137 votes) and other candidates with 1.1% (17 votes), among the 1,602 ballots cast by the borough's 3,357 registered voters, yielding a 47.7% turnout.

Education
The Wharton Borough School District serves public school students in kindergarten through eighth grade. As of the 2018–19 school year, the district, comprised of two schools, had an enrollment of 738 students and 73.7 classroom teachers (on an FTE basis), for a student–teacher ratio of 10.0:1. Schools in the district (with 2018–19 enrollment data from the National Center for Education Statistics) are 
Marie V. Duffy Elementary School with 462 students in grades K–5 and 
Alfred C. MacKinnon Middle School with 271 students in grades 6–8.

Public school students in ninth through twelfth grades attend Morris Hills High School, located in Rockaway Borough, and which also serves portions of Rockaway Borough and Rockaway Township. As of the 2018–19 school year, the high school had an enrollment of 1,279 students and 118.4 classroom teachers (on an FTE basis), for a student–teacher ratio of 10.8:1. The high school is part of the Morris Hills Regional High School District, which also includes students from Denville Township, who attend Morris Knolls High School along with students from parts of Rockaway Borough and Rockaway Township.

Transportation

Roads and highways

Public transportation
NJ Transit offers local bus service on the 880 route, which largely replaced the previous MCM10 route.

Notable people

People who were born in, residents of, or otherwise closely associated with Wharton include:

 Kirk Alyn (1910–1999), the first on-screen Superman, lived during his youth in Wharton, the son of Hungarian immigrants
 Alan Rowe Kelly (born 1959), independent film actor, director, writer and producer, specializing in horror films

References

External links

 Wharton Borough website
 Wharton Borough Public Schools
 
 School Data for the Wharton Borough Public Schools, National Center for Education Statistics
 Daily Record – Regional area newspaper
 History of Wharton Borough
 Abandoned Mines of NJ
 Wharton

 
1895 establishments in New Jersey
Borough form of New Jersey government
Boroughs in Morris County, New Jersey
Populated places established in 1895